Heliothryx is a genus of hummingbird in the family Trochilidae. The genus is assigned to the subfamily Polytminae which is sometimes referred to by the informal name "mangoes".

Taxonomy
The genus Heliothryx was introduced in 1831 by the German zoologist Friedrich Boie. Boie did not specify the type species but this was designated as the black-eared fairy by George Robert Gray in 1840. The genus name combines the Ancient Greek hēlios meaning "sun" with thrix meaning "hair".

The genus contains the following two species:

References

 
Taxonomy articles created by Polbot